A water resource region is the first level of classification used by the United States Geological Survey to divide and sub-divide the United States into successively smaller hydrologic units as part of the U.S. hydrologic unit system.

This first level of classification divides the United States into 21 major geographic areas, or regions. These geographic areas contain either the drainage area of a major river, or the combined drainage areas of a series of rivers.

List of water resource regions

References

External links
 

 
United States hydrologic unit system
Lists of drainage basins
Drainage basins
Watersheds of the United States
Regions of the United States
 Resourse